Glassbox Television was an independent Canadian broadcasting and media company specializing in the operation of multi-platform broadcast and video-on-demand (VOD) channels, content production, and digital publishing.

The company was formed in 2001 by Jeffery Elliot and was made as a TV company with the launch of its first television channel, BiteTV and is headquartered in Mississauga, Ontario, Canada.  It is majority owned by Blue Ant Media with the remaining shares owned by various investors.

Assets
 Aux — a music channel and website dedicated to new and emerging artists.
 BiteTV — a comedy-focused channel and website.
 Travel + Escape — channel focused on travel and adventure programming.

Glassbox also owned a production division creating television content and a digital publishing division that operates various digital properties including blogs, broadband portals, mobile sites, among others as well as representing various Canadian and international online advertising brands in Canada.

History
 2001: Company is founded by James Box.
 2003: James Box signed a deal to launch BiteTV.
 March 5, 2005: The company was made into a TV company and BiteTV launches.
 2006: BiteTV wins a Pixel Award.
 2007: BiteTV wins an International Emmy.
 2009: Aux TV launches.
 October 22, 2010: BiteTV undergoes a format logo and change.
 November 2010: Acquisition of Travel+Escape from CTVglobemedia
 July 5, 2013: The company is phased out and its 3 channels are now part of Blue Ant Media.

Closure
On April 11, 2011, it was announced that Blue Ant Media, an upstart media company headed by former Alliance Atlantis executive Michael MacMillan, would acquire a controlling interest in Glassbox Television. Blue Ant Media initially acquired a 29.9% stake in the company, with the option to expand their stake up to 75% which would give the company controlling interest. The additional equity giving Blue Ant Media controlling interest would require Canadian Radio-television and Telecommunications Commission (CRTC) approval, which was approved on September 14, 2011. The company would later be purchased outright by Blue Ant Media in the summer of 2012.  As of 2013, the company no longer exists, its 3 channels are now part of Blue Ant Media.

References

Blue Ant Media
Defunct broadcasting companies of Canada
Companies disestablished in 2012
Television production companies of Canada
Companies based in Mississauga